East Kilbride South is one of the 20 electoral wards of South Lanarkshire Council. Created in 2007, the ward elects three councillors using the single transferable vote electoral system and covers an area with a population of 16,985 people.

The ward is a Scottish National Party (SNP) stronghold with the party holding two of the three seats at every election since the ward was created.

Boundaries
The ward was created following the Fourth Statutory Reviews of Electoral Arrangements ahead of the 2007 Scottish local elections. As a result of the Local Governance (Scotland) Act 2004, local elections in Scotland would use the single transferable vote electoral system from 2007 onwards so East Kilbride South was formed from an amalgamation of several previous first-past-the-post wards. It contained part of the former Hairmyres/Crosshouse, Heatheryknowe, Lindsay and Westwoodhill wards as well as all of the former Greenhills and Whitehills wards. East Kilbride South covers a primarily urban area in southern East Kilbride including the Greenhills, Lindsayfield and Whitehills neighbourhoods. Following the Fifth Statutory Reviews of Electoral Arrangements ahead of the 2017 Scottish local elections, a few streets around Owen Avenue/Dale Avenue (generally considered to belong to The Murray neighbourhood) were transferred to the East Kilbride Central South ward and a corridor of farmland north of the White Cart Water previously part of the Avondale and Stonehouse ward was added.

Councillors

Election results

2022 election

2017 election

2012 election

2007 election

Notes

References

Wards of South Lanarkshire
East Kilbride